Meitei architecture, sometimes also referred to as Manipuri architecture, is the architecture produced by the Meitei speaking people, whose culture flourished in the Kangleipak kingdom and its neighbouring kingdoms from the middle of the fifteenth century BC. 
The Meitei architecture is best known for its temples (Laishang, Kiyong, Thellon), found scattered in the Kangleipak (present day Manipur). Other architectural forms that are still in existence are the grand gates (Hojang), Traditional houses (Yumjao), Public houses (Sanglen), Official buildings (Loishang), etc.

Styles

Meitei-style temples and other buildings are easily distinguished by the Holy Chirong (horns) at the top of the roof. Some significant examples include Hiyangthang Lairembi Temple and Sanamahi Kiyong Temple. 
There are also animal figures such as bulls and buffaloes carved on the walls.

Gallery

See also
 Hiyangthang Lairembi Temple
 Lainingthou Sanamahi Kiyong
 Pakhangba Temple, Kangla

References

Meitei architecture
Indian architectural history
Indian architectural styles
History of Manipur
Meitei culture